Robert Kirby (1948–2009) was a British musician and arranger.

Robert Kirby may also refer to:
 Robert J. Kirby (1889–1944), prison warden
 Robert Kirby (satirist) (1936–2007), South African satirist
 Robert Kirby (humor columnist) (born 1953), syndicated humor columnist for the Salt Lake Tribune
 Robert Kirby (cartoonist) (born 1962), American comics artist

See also 
 Robion Kirby (born 1938), American mathematician